is a railway station on the Nippō Main Line operated by JR Kyushu in Saiki, Ōita, Japan.

Lines

Layout 
The station, which is unstaffed, consists of two side platforms serving two tracks. The station building is a simple wooden sshed which serves only to house a waiting area and an automatic ticket vending machine. Another wooden shed, at right angles, is used occasionally as a community meeting space and as a marketplace for local produce. Access to the opposite side platform is by means of a footbridge.

Adjacent stations

History
Japanese National Railways (JNR) opened the station on 15 April 1959 as an additional station on the existing track of the Nippō Main Line. With the privatization of JNR on 1 April 1987, the station came under the control of JR Kyushu.

Passenger statistics
In fiscal 2015, there were a total of 5,728 boarding passengers, giving a daily average of 16 passengers.

See also
List of railway stations in Japan

References

External links 

Kariu (JR Kyushu)

Railway stations in Ōita Prefecture
Railway stations in Japan opened in 1959